Oleg Aleksandrovich Veretennikov (born 5 January 1970) is a professional Russian association football coach and a former international footballer. He is the runner-up goalscorer in the history of Russian Premier League, and holds several other goalscoring records.

Biography 

Most of Veretennikov's successes have come with SC Rotor Volgograd, for whom he played in 1992–1999. During that time he scored 143 goals. He has also become the season's top goalscorer three times (in 1995, 1997, and 1998), which is also an unbeaten record. Veretennikov also holds a record for the most goals scored in one season (25 in 1995). He is also one of only two players (along with Victor Panchenko) to score five goals in a league match (on 4 April 1998 against Shinnik).

Despite impressive goalscoring record, Oleg Veretennikov played only four unimportant matches for the national team.

In 2000–2001 Veretennikov had two short spells with foreign clubs, and then played in several First Division teams. In 2005, he returned to Rotor, playing in the Second Division. In 2009, he played in FC Volgograd. In the end of 2009 Veretennikov retired from playing and became a coach.

His son Pavel Veretennikov is a professional footballer now.

Career statistics

Honours
 1993 – Russian Premier League, runner-up
 1995 – Russian Premier League, top scorer (25 goals)
 1996 – Russian Premier League, 3rd position
 1997 – Russian Premier League, runner-up
 1997 – Russian Premier League, top scorer (22 goals)
 1998 – Russian Premier League, top scorer (22 goals)
 1993 – best attacking midfielder according to Sport-Express
 1995 – best attacking midfielder according to Sport-Express
 1997 – best attacking midfielder according to Sport-Express
 1998 – best central midfielder according to Sport-Express
 2005 – best player and best midfielder in the South Zone of Second Division according to Professional Football League.
 2009 – best player and best midfielder of Russian Second Division, Zone South

References
 Dreaming to enter the field in Rotor shirt, Roman Savyolov, Football Weekly (Еженедельник "Футбол"), 47, 2003

External links
 Fan club 
 Club profile
 Fans' website 

Living people
1970 births
Association football midfielders
Russian footballers
Russian football managers
FC Ural Yekaterinburg players
FC Rotor Volgograd players
Aris Thessaloniki F.C. players
Russia international footballers
FC SKA Rostov-on-Don players
FC Zhenis Astana players
Russian Premier League players
Lierse S.K. players
FC Elista players
Super League Greece players
Belgian Pro League players
Russian expatriate footballers
Expatriate footballers in Greece
Expatriate footballers in Belgium
Expatriate footballers in Kazakhstan
FC Sokol Saratov players
Russian expatriate sportspeople in Kazakhstan
FC Irtysh Pavlodar players
FC Mordovia Saransk players
FC Rotor Volgograd managers
FC Luch Vladivostok managers
PFC CSKA Moscow players
Russian expatriate football managers
Expatriate football managers in Kazakhstan
People from Revda, Sverdlovsk Oblast
Sportspeople from Sverdlovsk Oblast